Marghzar (also Romanized as Marghzār and Morghzār) is a village in Titkanlu Rural District, Khabushan District, Faruj County, North Khorasan Province, Iran. At the 2006 census, its population was 645, in 192 families.

References 

Populated places in Faruj County